William Brent Hinds (born January 16, 1974) is an American musician best known as a member of the Atlanta, Georgia metal band Mastodon, in which he shares guitar duties with Bill Kelliher and vocal duties with Troy Sanders and Brann Dailor.

Hinds is also lead guitarist/singer for the surfabilly band Fiend Without a Face, and is involved in other projects, including classic rock bands The Blood Vessels, West End Motel, Four Hour Fogger, The Last of the Blue Eyed Devils, Giraffe Tongue Orchestra, and Legend of the Seagullmen.

Biography 
In Mastodon's early years, Hinds would work as a full-time carpenter when not touring to promote the band.

Hinds left Alabama for Atlanta, Georgia in pursuit of a music career. It was at this time that he met Troy Sanders, a future member of Mastodon. According to Sanders, he "lived in his van for the next five years", becoming a member of Sanders' then band, Four Hour Fogger. The first practice he attended with this band he allegedly "showed up so wasted he couldn't even play".

Once Four Hour Fogger fell apart, the two stuck together, eventually meeting Brann Dailor and Bill Kelliher at a High on Fire concert in "their friend's basement". The four began a new musical venture with then singer Eric Saner, touring the southern US, working 40-hour weeks and committing to the band in their spare time. The band's mainstream success would ensue after Saner left the band, pushing Hinds to the forefront not just as a guitarist, but as a vocalist also, the duties of which he would share with Sanders.

Hinds continues to concentrate on Mastodon, with the majority of his time spent touring or in the studio. He also enjoys promoting his lesser-known psychedelic rockabilly band Fiend Without a Face and his classic rock band the Blood Vessels. Hinds composed the score to Jonah Hex.

In June 2011, Hinds' projects Fiend Without a Face and West End Motel released a split-double CD debut studio album.

In 2012, Hinds formed the supergroup Giraffe Tongue Orchestra with fellow guitarist Ben Weinman of The Dillinger Escape Plan fame, Jane's Addiction former bassist Eric Avery and The Mars Volta former drummer Thomas Pridgen.

Hinds will be working with psychedelic rock supergroup Legend of the Seagullmen along with Danny Carey of Tool and others. Their eponymous debut album was released in February 2018 on Dine Alone Records.

Equipment

Guitars 
Hinds favors Gibson Flying V's, typically in silverburst finishes, but also owns a wide variety of guitars including a Goldtop Les Paul, a Les Paul Florentine, a Lucite Flying V built by the Electrical Guitar Company, a Gibson SG, a Gibson SG Custom, Gibson Explorers, an Ampeg Dan Armstrong Plexi Guitar which was used in the video for "Oblivion," and a Michael Kelly Phoenix Hollowbody. He also has two custom First Act guitars: a 6-string used in the video for "Colony of Birchmen" (which has asymmetrical horns such as those seen on a Mosrite guitar, a Bigsby vibrato, silverburst finish, and a Mastodon logo inlaid on the headstock) and a 12-string DC Lola, also with a silverburst finish, used on the Unholy Alliance 3 tour to capture a fuller sound while guitarist Bill Kelliher was too ill to perform. Hinds owns a guitar similar to this one, though his has only nine strings. He also used a 1964 Fender Stratocaster and a 1952 Fender Telecaster while recording "Crack the Skye".

During live performances, Hinds favors his various Silverburst Flying V's. He often performs the solos and more melodic parts, whereas Bill Kelliher takes rhythm duties. As of 2014, Hinds has also added a PRS Starla to his collection, as seen in the Motherload video as well as live performances of the song. As revealed in the "Tune-Ups" section of the October 2007 issue of Guitar World, the two guitarists use three tunings: D Standard (E standard down one whole step, D G C F A D), Drop C tuning (D Standard tuning with the low D string tuned down an additional whole step, C G C F A D), and a third tuning similar to Drop C, but with the lowest string tuned down to A (A G C F A D).

In April 2016 Epiphone Guitars announced a signature guitar for him based on his Silverburst Flying V Custom and featuring his signature Lace Hammer Claw pickups

Straps 
Hinds favors vintage style guitar straps with psychedelic prints. As of 2016, Hinds can be seen playing multiple custom Overdrive Straps retro and full leather guitar straps live and in the studio recording 'Emperor of Sand'.

Amplifiers 
Hinds was featured in Marshall magazine as a JCM 800 2203 player, though since 2010 has favored Orange's Thunderverb Series Amplifiers. As of 2014, he is using Marshall JMP series amplifiers and a Diezel VH-4.

Effects 
Hinds uses a Boss Compressor CS-3, Boss Tuner TU-2, Monster Effects Mastortion, Ibanez Tube Screamer TS-9, Line 6 DL4 Delay Modeler, Voodoo Labs Pedal Power, and the Enema FX Mingebox. In 2014, he was seen using a Boss Digital Delay (DD-6), an ISP Technologies Decimator, an MXR Phase 90, MXR GT-OD, an Ernie Ball VP Junior and a Dunlop 105Q bass wah.

Guitar Rig & Signal Flow 
A detailed gear diagram of Brent Hind's 2014 Mastodon guitar rig is well-documented.

Influence and style 

Originally playing the banjo, Hinds learned his "signature style" of fast hybrid picking by emulating banjo fingerings on guitar. He frequently utilizes the minor pentatonic, natural minor, and the harmonic minor scales in his playing as well as many hammer-ons, pull-offs, and legato slides. Hinds grew up listening to country, but when he entered his late teens he started listening to Neurosis and Melvins, bands that would have a profound influence on his musicianship. Hinds has also stated that he is a big fan of the progressive and psychedelic rock genres, especially from the '70s.

On June 12, 2007, Hinds and bandmate Bill Kelliher won the Metal Hammer Golden Gods award for best shredders.

Hinds was featured along with Kelliher on the cover of Guitar Worlds 300th issue alongside guitar legends like Jimi Hendrix, Angus Young, and Kirk Hammett.

Hinds performs clean and harsh vocals in Mastodon, where he shares lead vocal duties with Troy Sanders and more recently, Brann Dailor.

Personal life 

Hinds has a strong affinity for smoking marijuana, and places doubt on the narrative that America is a free country. In an online interview, he stated that he smokes marijuana almost every day. Hinds is quoted as follows: "They say that if, you know, terrorists and like the freedom haters wanna blow up America because we're so free but why don't they fucking turn Holland into dust because you guys are the freest people in the world?"

Discography

Mastodon 

Remission (2002) – lead guitar, vocals
Leviathan (2004) – lead guitar, vocals
Blood Mountain (2006) – lead guitar, vocals
Crack the Skye (2009) – lead guitar, banjo, vocals
The Hunter (2011) – lead guitar, vocals, lap-steel
Once More 'Round the Sun (2014) – lead guitar, vocals
Emperor of Sand (2017) – lead guitar, vocals
Cold Dark Place (2017) – lead guitars, vocals, lap-steel, claps (track 3)
Hushed and Grim (2021) – lead guitar, vocals

Fiend Without a Face 

Brent Hinds Presents: Fiend Without a Face & West End Motel (2011)
Fiend Without a Face (2017)

West End Motel 

Brent Hinds Presents: Fiend Without a Face & West End Motel (2011)
Only Time Can Tell (2012)
Bad with Names, Good with Faces (2017)

Giraffe Tongue Orchestra 

Broken Lines (2016)

Legend of the Seagullmen 

Legend of the Seagullmen (2018)

Guest appearances 
 "Days of Self Destruction" by CKY on the album The Phoenix (guitar solos)
 "Make You Mine" by The Black Lips on the album Underneath the Rainbow (guitar)
 "Horse Hunter" by The Dillinger Escape Plan on the album Ire Works (vocals)
 "White Dwarf" by Zoroaster on the album Voice of Saturn (guitar solo and backing vocals)
 "At Arms Length" by Mouth of the Architect on the album The Ties That Blind (vocals)
 Jonah Hex as a Union soldier (film cameo)
 Hinds, along with Brann Dailor, appears on Killswitch Engage's live album (Set This) World Ablaze, in "From the Bedroom to the Basement" – documentary.
 In July 2011, Hinds starred in a commercial for Elmyr, a restaurant in Atlanta.
 In the Game of Thrones episode "Hardhome", Hinds and bandmates Brann Dailor and Bill Kelliher portrayed an extras role, as Wildlings and later in the episode as reanimated Wights.
 "Fear and Fate" by Archival on the album Fear and Fate (backing vocals, guitar overdubs)
 Hinds appears on the song "Land" by Pike vs The Automaton on their album Pike vs The Automaton.

References

External links 

 Official Mastodon website
 Mastodon at TheGrixer.com
 Interview with Brent Hinds at SuicideGirls.com
 Relapse Records
 Brann Interview, March 2009
 The story of Brent's Beard

1974 births
American heavy metal guitarists
American heavy metal singers
People from Pelham, Alabama
Living people
Lead guitarists
Singers from Alabama
Singers from Georgia (U.S. state)
Progressive metal guitarists
Mastodon (band) members
Guitarists from Alabama
Guitarists from Georgia (U.S. state)
American male guitarists
21st-century American male singers
21st-century American singers
21st-century American guitarists